The 1912–13 Bradford City A.F.C. season was the 10th in the club's history.

The club finished 13th in Division One, and reached the 1st round of the FA Cup.

Sources

References

Bradford City A.F.C. seasons
Bradford City